Qiqaj or Qeyqaj may refer to:
 Qeyqaj, West Azerbaijan